Werner Höfer (21 March 1913, in Kaisersesch, Rhine Province – 26 November 1997, in Cologne) was a German journalist. He started his career as a Nazi propagandist, working for the newspaper Das Reich. From 1933 to 1945 he was a member of the Nazi Party.

After the war, he worked for the public broadcasting institutions Nordwestdeutscher Rundfunk and Westdeutscher Rundfunk. He gained popularity as the host of the Sunday TV discussion show Internationaler Frühschoppen, modeled on NBC's Meet the Press and running from 1952 to 1987. When his publicly expressed satisfaction upon the execution of pianist Karlrobert Kreiten in September 1943 became known to a wider public, he was forced to retire in 1987.

His daughter Candida Höfer is a well known photographer.

1913 births
1997 deaths
People from Cochem-Zell
German male journalists
20th-century German journalists
German television journalists
German television talk show hosts
German broadcast news analysts
Nazi Party politicians
People from the Rhine Province
Commanders Crosses of the Order of Merit of the Federal Republic of Germany
German male writers
ARD (broadcaster) people
Westdeutscher Rundfunk people